Jessica Hannah Glynne (born 20 October 1989) is an English singer and songwriter. After signing with Atlantic Records, she rose to prominence in 2014 as a featured artist on the singles "Rather Be" by Clean Bandit and "My Love" by Route 94, both of which reached number one in the UK. She was considered one of the "Most Influential People Under 30" by Forbes magazine in 2019.

Her debut studio album, I Cry When I Laugh (2015), debuted at number one on the UK Albums Chart and saw the international success of the singles "Hold My Hand" and "Don't Be So Hard on Yourself". Glynne's second studio album, Always in Between (2018), also debuted at number one in the UK and saw continued success with the singles "I'll Be There", "These Days", "All I Am", "Thursday" and "One Touch"; the first of these made Glynne the first British female solo artist to have seven number one singles on the UK Singles Chart, beating Cheryl with five. Glynne has achieved multiple accolades throughout her career, including a Grammy Award and nine Brit Award nominations.

Early life
Jess Glynne was born in Hampstead and raised in Muswell Hill, North London, in a Jewish family.  Her mother, Alexandra (née Ingram), worked in A&R in the music industry. The family name was originally Goldstein, but her grandfather changed it to Glynne.

She applied for the television show The X Factor when she was 15 years old, but dropped out of the audition process following a disagreement with the producers.

She attended Rhodes Avenue Primary School, then attended Fortismere School, where she completed her A-levels in 2008, and took various jobs at a boutique, a fitness centre and a hairdresser's.

After a period spent travelling the world, Glynne worked for a music management company in her late teens and began networking with songwriters and producers, eventually honing her artistry for four years.

Career

2010–2013: Career beginnings
Glynne completed a month long 
music course at an East London college, Access to Music London, where she met her future collaborators: songwriter Jin Jin and producer Bless Beats. She also studied in Westminster University. One of Glynne and Jin Jin's compositions caught the attention of Black Butter Records, who signed Glynne to a publishing deal and introduced her to music managers and lawyers. Black Butter co-president Joe Gossa said of Glynne, "her voice just flipped me out, there was a fierceness to it. She can talk about everyday things in this way that's just epic". She signed a contract with Atlantic Records in August 2013, consequently leaving her job at the time in brand management for a drinks company.

2013–2016: I Cry When I Laugh and breakthrough

In 2013, deep house producer Route 94 approached Glynne about rewriting and providing vocals for his song "My Love". It was later released as a single in February 2014 and reached number one on the UK Singles Chart. It was later certified Platinum by the British Phonographic Industry. British band Clean Bandit heard "My Love" and approached Glynne to feature on their song "Rather Be". Band member Jack Patterson spoke of "a real subtlety of emotion in her voice". The collaboration produced the single which also charted atop the UK charts, becoming the third fastest-selling single and most streamed song of 2014. The single attained number one and top five positions on charts across Europe and Oceania, and was a top ten hit on the US Billboard Hot 100. Both "Rather Be" and "My Love" received nominations at the BRIT Awards for Best British Single. For her work on "Rather Be", Glynne won the Grammy Award for Best Dance Recording and was nominated for Song of the Year at the inaugural BBC Music Awards.

In July 2014, Glynne's debut solo single, the Gorgon City-produced "Right Here" was released. It charted in several countries, including at number six in the UK. Glynne appeared at many British music festivals during mid 2014, including Bestival, Glastonbury, Lovebox, V Festival and Wireless. She toured around the UK from October 2014, beginning in Sheffield and finishing at the Electric Brixton in London. Also during 2014, Glynne collaborated on songwriting projects with Little Mix, MO, Rudimental, and Tinie Tempah. A second collaboration with Clean Bandit, "Real Love", was released in November 2014 and reached number two in the UK.

Glynne's second solo single "Hold My Hand" was released in March 2015. It debuted at number one in the UK, where it spent three weeks. In June 2015, Glynne was featured on "Not Letting Go", a single by English rapper Tinie Tempah. It also reached number one in the UK, bringing Glynne's total of UK number one singles to four. She underwent surgery on her vocal cords in mid 2015 and consequently cancelled several live performances, including the Glastonbury Festival. Glynne's debut album I Cry When I Laugh was released in the UK in August 2015, following the number one single "Don't Be So Hard on Yourself". It features contributions from Knox Brown, Naughty Boy, Starsmith, Talay Riley, and Switch, as well as her regular collaborators Bless Beats and Jin Jin. I Cry When I Laugh entered the UK Albums Chart at number one and later received a triple Platinum certification.

In October 2015, Glynne appeared on the twelfth series of The X Factor as a guest judge at Cheryl's Judges' Houses segment. The same month, she presented the Vice magazine-produced documentary film The Brit Invasion, which documented the rise of EDM and British dance music in the United States. Glynne's track "Take Me Home" was released as the official Children in Need 2015 charity single in November and peaked at number six in the UK, becoming Glynne's eighth overall top ten single in the country. Glynne embarked on her first UK arena tour in November, titled the Take Me Home Tour.

2016–2021: Always in Between

In October 2016 and later in 2017, it was reported that Glynne was working with some "big" producers for her second album, including Ed Sheeran. One of the songs recorded was "Woman Like Me", which was later given to the band Little Mix for their fifth studio album LM5. In January 2018, Glynne featured on Rudimental's single "These Days" alongside American rapper Macklemore and Dan Caplen. The song was a commercial success, initially charting at number two for seven consecutive weeks behind "God's Plan" by Drake, before claiming the number one position in March. With this achievement, Glynne became the first British female solo artist in UK chart history to have six number-one singles. In May, Glynne performed at BBC Radio 1's Big Weekend in Swansea. Later that month, the lead single "I'll Be There" from her second album was released. The song later reached number one in June, becoming Glynne's seventh chart-topping single of her career. In August, second single "All I Am" was released and charted at number seven in the UK. The following month, the album Always in Between was released, becoming Glynne's second number one album. Her third single "Thursday" was released in October 2018 and has peaked at number three in the UK.

Glynne embarked on her Always in Between Tour from November 2018, covering Europe, the UK and the United States, over 50 dates. Many of the tour dates on the United States leg of the tour included Leon Bridges as a featured Artist. Also in November 2018, Glynne was announced as a special guest on the Spice Girls' reunion stadium tour, held in 2019. Glynne was due to perform at BBC Radio1 Big Weekend in 2019 however dropped out at last minute.

At the 2019 Brit Awards Glynne received five nominations, including Best British Female and Best British Single with both "These Days" and "I'll Be There".

In June 2019 Glynne received a lifetime ban from the Isle of Wight Festival when she canceled her set, giving only 10 minutes warning. The singer confessed that her reason for canceling was after a heavy night ("It is true that I went out and celebrated the end of the Spice World tour.") and, later that month, cancelled a number of gigs "on the advice of her vocal surgeon", including a headline performance at the Rochester Castle Concerts. However, the ban was revoked less than a year later.

2022–present: Career break and new record label Roc Nation
Following a disagreement with her record label, Glynne split from Atlantic Records in January 2022. In March 2022, she signed with Roc Nation.

Artistry
Glynne's musical influences include Frank Ocean and Amy Winehouse. She cites Adele, Sam Cooke, Destiny's Child, Aretha Franklin, Whitney Houston and Etta James as inspirations for her vocal style and rappers such as Eminem, Jay-Z and Kendrick Lamar for her songwriting. She has also listed India Arie, Beyoncé, Mary J. Blige, Girls Aloud, Mariah Carey and Mavis Staples as musical inspirations. Glynne said that Lauryn Hill's The Miseducation of Lauryn Hill was the album that motivated her to start writing songs.

Personal life
Glynne has stated that she wrote her first album after breaking up with a girlfriend, however, prefers not to use "labels", such as bisexual to describe her sexuality.

Filmography

Television

Discography

 I Cry When I Laugh (2015)
 Always in Between (2018)

Tours 
Headlining
Ain't Got Far to Go Tour (2015)
Take Me Home Tour (2016-2017)
Always in Between Tour (2018-2019) 
I'll Be There Tour (2021-2022)

Supporting
Rudimental (2013)
Beyonce (2015)
Spice Girls – Spice World – 2019 Tour (2019)

Awards and nominations

References

https://www.independent.co.uk/arts-entertainment/music/news/jess-glynne-twitter-instagram-deleted-b1834240.html

External links

 

1989 births
Living people
People from Hampstead
Atlantic Records artists
Bisexual singers
Bisexual women
Black Butter Records artists
English dance musicians
English women pop singers
English women singer-songwriters
British contemporary R&B singers
English soul singers
Grammy Award winners for dance and electronic music
English Jews
Jewish English musicians
Bisexual Jews
English LGBT singers
English LGBT songwriters
Singers from London
21st-century English women singers
English women in electronic music
Bisexual songwriters
20th-century English LGBT people
21st-century English LGBT people